Carnan is a townland in County Tyrone, Northern Ireland. It is situated in the historic barony of Dungannon Upper and the civil parish of Arboe and covers an area of 465 acres.

The name derives from the Irish: An Carn n (the little cairn/pile of rocks).

The population of the townland declined during the 19th century:

See also
List of townlands of County Tyrone

References

Townlands of County Tyrone
Barony of Dungannon Upper